"Transmission" is a song by English post-punk band Joy Division. Originally recorded in 1978 for the band's aborted self-titled album, it was later re-recorded the following year at a faster tempo and released by record label Factory as the band's debut single.

Release 

"Transmission" was released on 7" vinyl in October 1979 by record label Factory. It was re-released as a 12" single with a different sleeve in December 1980. The single charted twice in New Zealand, debuting at number 2 in September 1981 and re-appearing again at number 24 in July 1984.

The song was performed once by the band on television, for the BBC Something Else programme. Twenty seconds of the song is shown in the movie Control (2007), directed by Anton Corbijn, a film based on the biography of Ian's wife, Deborah Curtis's Touching from a Distance.

Reception
Greil Marcus has a chapter on this song in his book The History of Rock 'n' Roll in Ten Songs. According to Marcus, "'Transmission' is not an argument. It's a dramatization of the realization that the act of listening to the radio is a suicidal gesture. It will kill your mind. It will rob your soul." Marcus also quotes the band's bassist Peter Hook about the importance of this song: "We were doing a soundcheck at the Mayflower, in May, and we played 'Transmission': people had been moving around, and they all stopped to listen. I realized that was our first great song."

Legacy
In May 2007, NME magazine placed "Transmission" at number 20 in its list of the 50 "Greatest Indie Anthems Ever", one place below "Love Will Tear Us Apart". In 2016, Pitchfork placed "Transmission" at number 10 in its list of "The 200 Best Songs of the 1970s".

Cover versions
"Transmission" has been covered by: Low (on its EP Transmission); Bauhaus (as well as by frontman Peter Murphy on his solo tours); Innerpartysystem; The Weather Station; Girl in a Coma; and Hot Chip on the 2009 War Child charity album Heroes. It was played by The Smashing Pumpkins on their Adore Tour in 1998, with performances of the song usually lasting from 15 to 25 minutes. It was also covered by the cast of Control, a biographical film about the life of Ian Curtis. In 2009, the song was covered by Russian post-punk group Последние танки в Париже as "Радиоволна", in 2012 by Italian black metal band Forgotten Tomb, by Nomeansno, and by BadBadNotGood with the song "Mass Appeal" on their debut album, BBNG.

Uruguayan band RRRRRRR covered the song in Spanish, recording it twice, in the years 2000 and 2010.

Track listing
Both tracks written by Joy Division.

 7"/12"

 "Transmission" – 3:36
 "Novelty" – 3:59

Notes

References

External links
 
 
 Usage in film and television: see "Joy Division - Soundtrack. 'Transmission'" at the Internet Movie Database

1978 songs
1979 debut singles
Joy Division songs
Songs written by Bernard Sumner
Songs written by Peter Hook
Songs written by Stephen Morris (musician)
Songs written by Ian Curtis
Songs about dancing
Songs about radio
Factory Records singles
Song recordings produced by Martin Hannett